Pluméliau-Bieuzy is a commune in the Morbihan department in Brittany, north-western France. It was established on 1 January 2019 by merger of the former communes of Pluméliau (the seat) and Bieuzy.

See also
Communes of the Morbihan department

References

Communes of Morbihan

Communes nouvelles of Morbihan
Populated places established in 2019
2019 establishments in France